Katharina Otte (born 29 May 1987 in Hamburg) is a German field hockey player. At the 2012 Summer Olympics, she competed for the Germany women's national field hockey team in the women's event.

References

External links
 
 
 
 

1987 births
Living people
German female field hockey players
Olympic field hockey players of Germany
Field hockey players at the 2012 Summer Olympics
Field hockey players at the 2016 Summer Olympics
Olympic bronze medalists for Germany
Olympic medalists in field hockey
Medalists at the 2016 Summer Olympics
Field hockey players from Hamburg
21st-century German women